Llwyn Bryn-Dinas is an Iron Age hillfort on the north side of the Tanat valley, about  west of the village of Llangedwyn, in Powys, Wales.

Description
There is a simple inturned entrance on the south-east.

There was excavation in 1983. It was found that the site was first occupied in the late Bronze Age, about the 10th–9th century BC; the defences were enlarged about the 4th–3rd century BC, during the Iron Age. Built into the rear of the rampart was an Iron Age smithy, for bronze-casting and iron-working, probably to serve the requirements of the settlement.

See also
 Hillforts in Britain
 List of Scheduled prehistoric Monuments in Powys (Montgomeryshire)

References

Hillforts in Powys
Scheduled monuments in Powys